Constantine Scaramanga-Ralli JP (17 July 1854 – 17 March 1934), was a British Liberal Party politician and author.

Background
He was born in London as Constantine Ralli the eldest son of Pandeli Constantine Ralli and Harriet Ralli. He was educated at Harrow School and Brasenose College, Oxford. On 8 August 1910 his name was legally changed to Constantine Scaramanga-Ralli by Royal Licence. He married Julia Townsend Lawrence, of Long Island, New York (USA). They had one son and one daughter.

Professional career
He was in the banking business for many years. He was an ardent advocate of compulsory military training, and an author of articles on this and kindred subjects in leading military journals and the magazines.
He was a Life Governor of the Brompton Hospital for Consumption and Diseases of the Chest. He was a Justice of the Peace in Hampshire. He was Vice-President of the Allotments and Small Holdings Association of England.

Political career
He was Liberal candidate for the Isle of Wight Division of Hampshire at the December 1910 General Election.

In addition to standing as a parliamentary candidate, he stood as a candidate in 1913 for election to the London County Council for the Liberal backed Progressive Party;

Publications

Vanessa, 1904
Plutocracy, 1907
The Wisdom of the Serpent
The Succession
The Strange Story of Falconer Thring
The Missing Monarch, 1907
Julian Steele, 1908
The Tyranny of Honour, 1911

References

1854 births
1934 deaths
Liberal Party (UK) parliamentary candidates
People educated at Harrow School
Alumni of Brasenose College, Oxford
English male novelists